Pavel Kotov may refer to:
 Pavel Kotov (footballer)
 Pavel Kotov (tennis)
 Pavel Kotov (canoeist)